7/7 Ripple Effect is a 57-minute homemade film produced and narrated under the pseudonym "Muad'Dib", who was later named by the BBC as conspiracy theorist John Hill. The film disputes the official account of the 7 July 2005 London bombings (also known as 7/7), a terrorist attack on public transport in Central London, by four suicide bombers later named as Hasib Hussain, Germaine Lindsay, Shehzad Tanweer and Mohammad Sidique Khan.

Content
The film poses numerous questions about the events surrounding the attacks and presents alternative theories for who was behind them. The film implicates the Metropolitan Police and Tony Blair and claims that the true perpetrators of the attacks were MI5 and/or Mossad, who tricked the four men into travelling to London with rucksacks, in order to provide CCTV footage later to be used as evidence in the investigation of the attacks. It alleges that the four bombers were actually murdered in Canary Wharf and did not die as suicide bombers in the explosions on the three tube trains and one bus where the attacks took place. This thesis was taken up in the book on the London Bombings Terror on the Tube.

Critical reception
An episode of the BBC programme The Conspiracy Files titled "7/7", which first aired on 20 June 2009, addressed part of the claims made in the film as well as other theories surrounding the attacks. The programme also revealed Muad'Dib to be John Hill from Sheffield, tracking him down to an address in Kells in the Republic of Ireland.

Release
The film was first released on the Internet on 5 November 2007, two years after the attacks. Physical copies  were also sent to many of the people connected with the attacks. The film was shown on 9 September 2009 at the 9/11 Film Festival at the Grand Lake Theater in Oakland, California. On 7 July 2012 and 7 July 2019 updated and expanded versions were released.

Legal action
Hill was arrested and extradited to the United Kingdom on a charge of perverting the course of justice for sending DVDs of the film to the judge and jury foreman in a trial linked to the attacks. He was acquitted on 12 May 2011.

References

External links
Film's Official Website
Rebuttal to Film's Claims
BBC News Magazine (30 June 2009)
BBC News Blog "The Man Behind 7/7 Ripple Effect" (24 June 2009)

2007 films
British documentary films
Documentary films about conspiracy theories
Internet documentary films
July 2005 London bombings
2007 documentary films
2000s English-language films
2000s British films